In mathematics — specifically, in stochastic analysis — Dynkin's formula is a theorem giving the expected value of any suitably smooth statistic of an Itō diffusion at a stopping time. It may be seen as a stochastic generalization of the (second) fundamental theorem of calculus. It is named after the Russian mathematician Eugene Dynkin.

Statement of the theorem
Let X be the Rn-valued Itō diffusion solving the stochastic differential equation

For a point x ∈ Rn, let Px denote the law of X given initial datum X0 = x, and let Ex denote expectation with respect to Px.

Let A be the infinitesimal generator of X, defined by its action on compactly-supported C2 (twice differentiable with continuous second derivative) functions f : Rn → R as

or, equivalently,

Let τ be a stopping time with Ex[τ] < +∞, and let f be C2 with compact support. Then Dynkin's formula holds:

In fact, if τ is the first exit time for a bounded set B ⊂ Rn with Ex[τ] < +∞, then Dynkin's formula holds for all C2 functions f, without the assumption of compact support.

Example

Dynkin's formula can be used to find the expected first exit time τK of Brownian motion B from the closed ball

which, when B starts at a point a in the interior of K, is given by

Choose an integer j. The strategy is to apply Dynkin's formula with X = B, τ = σj = min(j, τK), and a compactly-supported C2 f with f(x) = |x|2 on K. The generator of Brownian motion is Δ/2, where Δ denotes the Laplacian operator. Therefore, by Dynkin's formula,

Hence, for any j,

Now let j → +∞ to conclude that τK = limj→+∞σj < +∞ almost surely and

as claimed.

References

  (See Vol. I, p. 133)
  (See Section 7.4)

Stochastic differential equations
Probability theorems